Jaworniczka is a river of Poland, a tributary of the Klikawa.

Rivers of Poland